Raphidonema is an extinct genus of calcareous sponges.

Fossil records
This genus is known in the fossil records from the Cretaceous period of France and United Kingdom to the Eocene of India (age range: from 136.4 to 37.2 million years ago).

Species
 †Raphidonema farringdonense Sharpe

References

Prehistoric sponge genera
Calcaronea